The 2017–18 Football Superleague of Kosovo season, also known as the Vala Superleague of Kosovo for sponsorship reasons, is the 19th season of top-tier football in Kosovo. The season began on 18 August 2017 and concluded on 20 May 2018. Trepça'89 are the defending champions from the previous season. A total of 12 teams are competing in the league: nine teams from the 2016–17 season and three promoted from the 2016–17 First League.

Teams and stadiums

Trepça and Hajvalia were relegated after finishing the previous season in eleventh and twelfth-place respectively. They were replaced by the champions and runners-up of the 2016–17 First League, Flamurtari and Vëllaznimi respectively. Vllaznia Pozheran defeated Ferizaj in a play-off to claim their top-flight spot.
Note: Table lists in alphabetical order.

Source:Scoresway

League table

Results
Each team plays three times against every opponent (either twice at home and once away or once at home and twice away) for a total of 33 games played each.

Matches 1–22

Matches 23–33

Relegation play-offs
The ninth and tenth-placed teams, Vëllaznimi and Flamurtari respectively, each paired off against the third and fourth-placed teams from the 2017–18 First Football League of Kosovo season, Vushtrria and Ferizaj respectively; the two winners will play in the top-flight next season. As with previous seasons, both play-offs will be played on neutral ground.

Flamurtari retained their spot in 2018–19 Football Superleague of Kosovo; Vushtrria remained in 2018–19 First Football League of Kosovo.

Ferizaj were promoted to 2018–19 Football Superleague of Kosovo; Vëllaznimi were relegated to 2018–19 First Football League of Kosovo.

Season statistics

Scoring

Top scorers

Notes and references

Notes

References

External links
Official website

Football Superleague of Kosovo seasons
Kosovo
1